Johnny Banks (born December 25, 1861 in Richmond, Virginia), was an African American boxer who fought under the sobriquet "The Darkey Wizard" and was the Negro Middleweight Champion of the World during the mid-1880s.

Standing 5'6" tall (some sources claim he was 5'5.5" tall), Banks fought out of New York City at a weight of 128-160 lbs. from 1883 to 1899. In his career, he racked up an official record of 11 wins (three by K.O.) against eight losses (being K.O.ed three times) and 17 draws. Most of his fights went unrecorded.

Boxing historian Nat Fleischer claimed that he fought as many as five times a week in Philadelphia and he averaged a fight per week for five years. Fleischer claimed that Banks won over 90% of his bouts. Reportedly, Banks contorted his mouth as he fought and snorted, grunted, and yelled while in the ring. He was a very smart boxer with a good right.

He claimed the Negro Middleweight title but lost it to James Desverney on January 26, 1887 in a fight in New York City when he was disqualified in the ninth round.

References

|-

1861 births
Boxers from Virginia
African-American boxers
Middleweight boxers
World colored middleweight boxing champions
Year of death missing
American male boxers